Empis nigripes is a species of fly in the family Empididae. It is included in the subgenus Empis. It is found in the  Palearctic realm.

References

External links
Images representing Empis at BOLD
Ecology of Commanster

Empis
Insects described in 1794
Asilomorph flies of Europe